Roseibaca ekhonensis is a Gram-negative, aerobic and alkalitolerant bacterium from the genus of Roseibaca which has been isolated from water from the Ekho Lake in the Antarctica.

References 

Rhodobacteraceae
Bacteria described in 2009